Lakhimpur railway station is  main railway station in Lakhimpur Kheri district, Uttar Pradesh. Its code is LMP. It serves Lakhimpur city. The station consists of three platforms. The platforms are well sheltered. It lacks many facilities including escalator.

In February 2010, Railway Minister of India Mamata Banerjee declared the gauge conversion in Lucknow–Sitapur–Pilibhit metre-gauge line. the work on the rail line started in May 2016. CRS inspection for this railway line was held on 18 March 2019. On 28 August the minister of state railway inaugurated the train. Now  trains are running from Lucknow to Lakhimpur. There are just two trains right now which are running between Lucknow and Lakhimpur. The Gomti Express which runs from Gorakhpur to Lakhimpur via Lucknow and Sitapur and another train is a passenger running between Lakhimpur–Sitapur and Lucknow, after the Minister of State for Railway inaugurated this Sitapur and Lakhimpur section. Now the next section is Gola–Mailani and then from Mailani to Pilibhit and after this, the complete route will be opened for railways operation.

Trains
 Ruhelkhand Express
 Nainital Express
 Agrafort Express
 Lucknow-Mailani Unreserved Express
 Mailani-Gorakhpur Gomtinagar Express

References

Railway stations in Lakhimpur Kheri district
Lucknow NER railway division
Lakhimpur, Uttar Pradesh